This list covers television programs whose first letter (excluding "the") of the title is N.

N

NA
Naked and Afraid
The Naked Brothers Band
Naked City
Naked Josh
The Naked Truth
The Name of the Game
Name That Tune
The Name's the Same
Nancy
The Nancy Drew Mysteries
Nancy Grace
The Nancy Walker Show
The Nanny
Nanny and the Professor
Nanny 911
Naruto
Naruto: Shippuden
Nascar Racers
Nashville (2007)
Nashville (2012)
Nashville Squares
Nashville Star
The Nate Berkus Show
Nate & Jeremiah by Design
Nathan for You
National Bingo Night (US)
National Geographic Explorer
National Vocabulary Championship
Naturally, Sadie (Canada)
Nature Cat
The Nature of Things
Navy Log

NB
The NBC Mystery Movie
NBC Nightly News
NBC Sunday Night Football

NC
NCIS
NCIS
NCIS: Los Angeles
NCIS: New Orleans

NE
Ned and Stacey
Ned's Declassified School Survival Guide
Ned's Newt
 Nerds and Monsters
Needles and Pins
The Neighborhood
Neighbours
Nella the Princess Knight
Neon Genesis Evangelion 
Neon Joe: Werewolf Hunter 
Neon Rider (Canada)
Neo Yokio 
Never Have I Ever
The Nevers
The New Adventures of He-Man
The New Adventures of Jonny Quest
The New Adventures of the Lone Ranger
The New Adventures of Old Christine
The New Adventures of Pinocchio
The New Adventures of Winnie the Pooh
The New Adventures of Zorro (1981)
The New Adventures of Zorro (1997)
New Amsterdam (2008)
New Amsterdam (2018)
The New Avengers
The New Celebrity Apprentice
The New Dick Van Dyke Show
New Game!
New Girl
The New Normal
The New Perry Mason
The New Phil Silvers Show
The New Price Is Right
The New Scooby-Doo Movies
The New Scooby and Scrappy-Doo Show
The New Show
New Tricks (British)
New Warriors
The New Yogi Bear Show
New York Goes to Hollywood
New York Goes to Work
New York Undercover
New Zoo Revue
Newhart
Newport Harbor: The Real Orange County
The NewsHour with Jim Lehrer
Newsnight (BBC)
NewsRadio
The Newsroom
The Newlywed Game
Newlyweds: The First Year
Newlyweds: Nick and Jessica
Nexo Knights
Next
Next Great Baker
The Next Iron Chef
The Next Iron Chef Vietnam
Next of Kim (UK)
The Next Star (Canada)
The Next Step

NF
NFL AM
NFL on CBS
NFL Cheerleader Playoffs
NFL on TNT

NI
Nick Arcade
The Nick Cannon Show
Nick News
Nickelodeon Guts
Nickelodeon Robot Wars
Nicky, Ricky, Dicky & Dawn
Nightcap (1953) (Canada)
Nightcap (1963) (Canada)
Nightcap (2016) (US)
Night Court
Night Gallery
Night Heat
Nightlife
Nightline
Nightly Pop
The Night Manager (UK)
Nightmare Ned
Nightmares & Dreamscapes: From the Stories of Stephen King
The Night Shift
Night Stalker
Night Stand with Dick Dietrick
Night Visions
Nightwatch with Steve Scott
Ni Hao, Kai-Lan
Nikita
Nikki
Nikki & Sara Live
Nina's World
Nine for IX
The Nine Lives of Chloe King
Ninja Turtles: The Next Mutation
Ninjago: Masters of Spinjitzu
The Nine
Nine to Five
Nineteen Eighty-Four
The Nineties
Nip/Tuck
Nitro Circus
Nitro Circus Live

NO
No Good Nick
The No.1 Ladies Detective Agency
Noah (Philippines)
Noah and Saskia
Noah Knows Best
Nobody's Watching
Noddy (US/Canada)
Noddy, Toyland Detective
Noggin the Nog (British)
Norby
The Norm Show
Normal People
Norman Picklestripes
North and South
North Shore
Northern Exposure
Nostalgia Critic (Web series)
Not Going Out
Not Necessarily the News
Not the Nine O'Clock News
Not Safe with Nikki Glaser
The Not-Too-Late Show with Elmo
Notes from the Underbelly
Nothing Sacred
Noticentro 4
Notorious (2004)
Notorious (2016)
Nova (Netherlands)
Nova (U.S.A.)
Novoland: The Castle in the Sky (China)
Now and Again
Now You See It
Nowhere Boys (Australia)
Nowhere Man

NT 

 NTSF:SD:SUV::

NU
Number 96
Numberjacks
Number One Surprise
Number Please
Numb3rs
Numb Chucks (Canada)
Nummer 28 (Dutch)
 The Numtums
Nurse Jackie
The Nurses
Nurses
Nutri Ventures
The Nutshack

NX
NXT UK

NY
Nyanko Days (TBA, Japan)
NYC 22
NY Ink
NY Med
N.Y.P.D.
NYPD Blue

Previous:  List of television programs: M    Next:  List of television programs: O